Davis Entertainment (also known as Davis Entertainment Company) is an American film and television production company, founded by John Davis in 1984.

Davis's three divisions–feature film, independent film, and television–develop and produce film and television projects for the major studios, independent distributors, networks and cable broadcasters. The company itself has enjoyed a long-standing first-look production deal at 20th Century Studios, although it also produces projects for all studios and mini-majors.

History 
The company was founded in 1984 by filmmaker John Davis and it was incorporated in Nevada on December 2, 1985. The company was officially established on May 21, 1986, in order to produce mid-to-high budget action films that were financed entirely by a studio, starting with Predator, a co-production with Lawrence Gordon Productions and Silver Pictures, and a series of other films that were planned for release by 20th Century Fox.  It was decided that it would be done independently with co-investors, and it would help anticipate the expansion of telefilms and sitcoms.

On February 18, 1987, Davis Entertainment partnered with Mark L. Lester of his Mark Lester Films company in order to handle the development of action-adventure films which were produced by the company, directed by Mark L. Lester, and it was independently financed by the two companies. The films that were made by the Lester/Davis alliance had ranked in the $5–10 million range, and would expect the co-venture to handle the production of two films before the yearend.

In 1994, it launched its first foray into interactive games, and launched Catapult Entertainment, Inc. to produce its interactive video games. That same year, Davis Entertainment Company signed a production deal with 20th Century Fox to develop feature films.

In 1995, Davis Entertainment launched its art-house division Davis Entertainment Classics, which was subsequently renamed Davis Entertainment Filmworks in 2002. In 1998, Davis Entertainment struck a deal with 20th Century Fox Television to produce television shows for its networks, both broadcast and cable.

In 2007, Michael Dorman joined its television division. At the same time, they signed a development pact with Fox Television Studios to produce series for television.

In 2011, John Fox, a former employee of 20th Century Fox, joined the company. In 2013, it signed a deal with Sony Pictures Television to develop television shows for platforms, broadcast, cable and streaming.

Filmography

Theatrical films

1980s

1990s

2000s

2010s

2020s

Upcoming

Direct-to-video films

1990s

2000s

Television movies

1990s

2000s

2010s

2020s

Television series

2010s

2020s

Highest-grossing films

References

Further reading

External links
 Box office grosses for Davis Entertainment releases (The Numbers)

Mass media companies established in 1984
Film production companies of the United States
Television production companies of the United States
American independent film studios
Companies based in Nevada